Dongzhai Port Nature Reserve, also called the Hainan Dongzhai Bay National Nature Reserve, Dongzhai Harbor Mangrove, and Dongzhai Harbor Mangrove Natural Reserve Area, is located within Dongzhai Harbor, in the area of Yanfeng Town, Meilan District, Haikou, Hainan, China. The coastline is very irregular and includes a number of bays and tidewater gullies. The mangrove forest on the south coast provides a habitat for birds and other wildlife.

The Nature Reserve has been placed on the UNESCO World Heritage Sites Tentative List.

There are 36 species of mangrove plants in 19 families. The reserve is also home to around 214 species of birds, 115 molluscs species, 160 species of fish, as well as shrimp, crabs and various crustaceans. Numerous species of waterfowl spend the winter in this reserve, including  Australian migratory birds.

References

Tourist attractions in Hainan
Nature reserves in Hainan